Josep Pujadas Domingo (April 6, 1931) is a Spanish parliamentarian, lawyer and businessman who was a member of the 1st Spanish Congress of Duputies representing Catalonia from March 27, 1980, to August 31, 1982. Pujadas was present in parliamentary session in Madrid on February 23, 1981, when a military group of 200 of the Guardia Civil attempted a coup d'état by storming into a meeting of the Congress of Deputies. After burst of machine-gun fire, Pujadas, along with 350 members of Parliament, was held hostage for about 17 hours. All emerged uninjured the next morning after the coup failed. The event was made into a motion picture by Warner Brothers entitled 23F: la película (Spanish nomenclature for 23 February).
Pujadas is former CEO of PJM Pujadas, S.A., a privately held manufacturer of specialized adhesives. Pujadas' great-grandfather founded the business in 1890 making industrial chemicals. Pujadas has served on numerous governmental committees and agencies.

Biography

Born in Barcelona, Pujadas obtained a Bachelor of Laws degree, then a business degree from the International Graduate School of Management (IESE) at the University of Navarra. He became Secretary General of the Spanish Committee of the LECE (European League for Economic Cooperation). In 1964 he was founding president of the Spanish Youth Chamber and, in 1971, Executive Vice President of the World Federation of Youth Chambers. He was a member of the executive committee of the "Centristes de Catalunya (CC–UCD)" and was President of the Provincial Executive Committee of Barcelona.

In 1953, he joined the family business, PJM Pujadas, S.A.  He studied marketing in the United States. While in the US, he negotiated licensing to make specialized adhesives and techniques used in the manufacture of cigarettes, including the filters, packages, seals and the wrapper and box. This led to Pujadas' building a new factory in Barcelona in 1966 for this purpose, creating a new direction for the company. As of 2010, Pujadas has become a global supplier of industrial adhesives and processes used to make packaging for foods, beverages, pharmaceuticals, textiles and other applications, using the slogan (for English-speaking clients) "What Can We Glue For You?"

Coup attempt

On February 23, 1981, Pujadas was in Spain's Congress of Deputies in Madrid when a military group of 200 of the Guardia Civil attempted a coup d'état by storming into the building and locking themselves in with virtually the entire political leadership of the country. A burst of gunfire from submachine guns wounded some visitors in the upper gallery. Shots were heard live over Spanish radio which was broadcasting coverage of the parliamentary vote. The attackers, led by Franco loyalist Lt. Colonel Antonio Tejero, held ministers and deputies at gunpoint and forced them to lie on the floor while waiting for army generals outside to bring down the democratic government. Pujadas was one of 350 members of parliament held hostage for about 17 hours. The coup attempt ended when King Juan Carlos, the head of state for Spain's then five year old democracy, denounced the attempt in a nationally televised address. The ministers and deputies emerged one by one from their all night ordeal in the Parliament building shouting "Long Live Freedom".

The event was made into a motion picture in 2011 by Warner Brothers entitled 23F: la película (23F: the movie). Film critic Johnathan Holland of Variety magazine said, "the script is disappointingly silent on the issues of personal motivation that could have generated some real tension". He said the period detail of the film was good, but the film followed the officially sanctioned version without controversy.

Reunion
 The members of the lower house of the Cortes Generales reunited on Wednesday, February 23, 2011, to commemorate the 30-year anniversary of the coup d'état attempt. The image shows them standing on the steps of the Congress of Deputies in Madrid. King Juan Carlos spoke at a luncheon which included 144 of the 350 parliamentarians held hostage three decades earlier.

References

External links
 :ca:Josep Pujadas Domingo 

1931 births
Members of the 1st Congress of Deputies (Spain)
20th-century Spanish businesspeople
Living people